Ahmed Ezz (born 12 January 1959) is an Egyptian businessman and one-time politician, the owner of Ezz Steel and the former chairman of Egypt's national assembly's budget committee. He was also the organizational secretary of the  National Democratic Party of Egypt (NDP) .

Life and career
Ahmed Ezz was born to a Muslim Egyptian father, Lieutenant Abdel Aziz Ezz, and a Muslim Egyptian mother, Afaf Halawa, in 1959; into a family that had “traded building materials for generations,” according to The Washington Post. He was elected twice as the head of the Arab Iron and Steel Union.  Prior to his work in organized labor, Ezz was a parliamentary member representing the districts of Sadat-Monouf-Sers al-Liyan in Monofuyia from the year 2000 to 2011, and also the Chairman of the Planning and Budgeting Committee of the People's Assembly of Egypt as a member of the National Democratic Party. (According to Al Jazeera, he resigned from the NDP on 29 January 2011.)

Prior to the revolution, opposition parties, other parliamentarians, and groups accused Ezz companies of monopolizing the steel industry in Egypt by holding more than 60 percent of the market share, describing it as an act that is backed up by the government, an act that was described by the active parliamentarian Aboul Ezz Al Hariri as "enhancing the proliferation of monopolies rather than fighting them". The groups mentioned are even blaming him of increasing the steel prices of as much as 70 percent. In response Ezz has told reporters that a competition law "would at least provide a legal framework preventing everyone from making accusations".

Ezz companies were investigated twice for monopoly by the Egyptian Competition Authority, both before and after the January 2011 Revolution. The companies were found "not guilty" of any monopolistic or anti-competition actions both times. Ahmed Ezz was also prosecuted for the same charge and found not guilty by the Egyptian Economic Court in July 2013.

Ezz was planning on running in the 2015 Egyptian parliamentary election as an independent in the Sadat City constituency, though he lost his appeal after he was disqualified from running. Another appeal was adjourned until 22 April 2015.

Arrest and conviction
After the resignation of Hosni Mubarak due to the 2011 Egyptian revolution, on 17 February 2011 Ahmed Ezz was arrested, along with former interior minister Habib el-Adly, former minister of housing Ahmed Maghrabi and former tourism minister Zuheir Garana. News of the arrests spread quickly in the local Egyptian press.  As a result, many fear that Ahmed Ezz will not receive a fair trial under a 1981 provision of Egyptian emergency law.  Amr Bargisi, a senior partner with the Egyptian Union of Liberal Youth, told the Washington Times  "I am afraid the divorce of wealth from power will probably not only lead to the unfair treatment of many businessmen and former politicians, but might also take Egypt in a direction that will be devastating for the economy and the prospects of democracy. Every businessman at the moment is a suspect of the revolutionary regime and the public. If this trend continues, we will see major capital flight from Egypt." Joe Stork, the deputy director of Human Rights Watch's Middle East and North Africa division, told the Washington Times of Mr. Ezz:  "Certainly he, like anyone else, has his right to a fair trial. The judicial proceedings he is subjected to should meet fair-trial standards; he should know the accusations against him; he should be able to confront those who are accusing him."

In an 11 March letter from prison that was published on the Bikyamas website, Mr. Ezz refuted the charges against him and warned that "In this unprecedented time for the country, it is important to remember what our youth are calling for: freedom, fairness and democracy. My hope is that this commitment to a bright future for Egypt is not undermined at its first hurdle through a desire to find scapegoats. I truly hope I can at least depend on a full representation of the facts, due legal process and a fair trial."

On 5 October 2012, Ahmed Ezz was convicted of money laundering and sentenced to seven years in jail – plus a fine of 19.5bn Egyptian pounds (about $3bn; £2bn). These sentences were later appealed by Ahmed Ezz.

On 9 March 2018, the Cairo Criminal Court closed the case against Ahmed Ezz. The court also reversed a travel ban on him.

References

External links

EZZ Steel
National Democratic Party of Egypt
videohat.masrawy.com
Fahim, Kareem, Michael Slackman, and David Rohde. "Egypt's ire turns to confidant of Mubarak's son." The New York Times. 7 February 2011.

1959 births
Living people
Members of the House of Representatives (Egypt)
National Democratic Party (Egypt) politicians
Egyptian businesspeople
People of the Egyptian revolution of 2011